The first season of Criminal Minds: Beyond Borders premiered on CBS on March 16, 2016 and ended May 25, 2016. The season consisted of 13 episodes.

Cast

Main 
 Gary Sinise as Jack Garrett
 Alana de la Garza as Clara Seger
 Daniel Henney as Matthew "Matt" Simmons
 Tyler James Williams as Russ "Monty" Montgomery
 Annie Funke as Mae Jarvis

Special guests 
 Joe Mantegna as David Rossi
 Kirsten Vangsness as Penelope Garcia

Recurring 
 Kelly Frye as Kristy Simmons
 Ezra Dewey as Jake Simmons
 Declan Whaley as David Simmons
 Brittany Uomoleale as Josie Garrett
 Sherry Stringfield as Karen Garrett

Production
A proposed new series in the Criminal Minds franchise was announced in January 2015, and was to be named Criminal Minds: Beyond Borders. Gary Sinise and Anna Gunn had been cast in the lead roles of Jack Garrett and Lily Lambert, with Tyler James Williams and Daniel Henney being cast as Russ "Monty" Montgomery and Matthew "Matt" Simmons, respectively.

On May 8, 2015, CBS announced that Criminal Minds: Beyond Borders, has been picked up for the 2015–16 season, however, it was soon announced that Gunn had departed the series, with Alana de la Garza and Annie Funke further being cast as series regulars. The season was originally intended to premiere on March 2, 2016, but was pushed back by two weeks and instead premiered on March 16, 2016, and filled the Wednesday 10:00pm time slot, airing immediately after the original Criminal Minds. The episodes, while produced in a certain order, are not aired in that way.

Episodes

Ratings

Live + SD ratings

Live + 7 Day (DVR) ratings

Home media

References

External links 
 
 

2016 American television seasons
Season 1